Rockport is an unincorporated community in western Pike County, Illinois, United States. The community is on Illinois Route 96 about eight miles southeast of New Canton.

References

Unincorporated communities in Pike County, Illinois
Unincorporated communities in Illinois